Lambton Jaffas Football Club is an Australian soccer club based in Lambton a suburb of Newcastle, New South Wales. They compete in the National Premier Leagues Northern NSW, the highest division of the New South Wales Football Leagues.

History
Lambton Jaffas started off as the senior team of Lambton Soccer Club which was established in 1957.

The club prospered during the 1960s, with the clubs first All Age side being established in 1968. In 1969, the club was invited to participate in the 2nd Division Competition by the Northern NSW Soccer Federation, to replace Dudley Redhead. The club played under the name of Dudley Lambton that year to fulfill the Federation's obligations to the English Soccer Pools. The club struggled that year with the 1st Grade running last and the Reserves Grade 8th, with both recording record losses to Maitland Club.

In 1969, the Under 16 side made the Final, followed by obtaining the Seniors' first title in 1970. In 1975, all 3 Senior sides made the Semi-finals for the first time.

The Seniors home ground is Arthur Edden Oval in New Lambton since 1969, except for one season in 1976. The Juniors play their home games at Harry Edwards Oval and Lambton No. 1 Oval, both in Lambton Park.

In 1978, Ernie Lamb had to differentiate between a newly formed 'All Age' and the 2nd Division senior club, and the name Jaffas was first formally used. Originally, the club one committee to run the Junior and Senior teams. However, in 1980 two committees were formed. The club was incorporated as Lambton Jaffas Soccer Club in 1987, with a Juniors and Seniors division. In 2008, Lambton became a Football Club.

After 42 years of amateur football, in 2010 the club became semi-professional.

In 2013, the club was first promoted to the NBN State Football League. Making the Grand Final in their first year in the top division.

2014 was a break-through year for the Jaffas, taking part in the inaugural FFA designated National Premier League in Newcastle. In only their second year in the top division of Newcastle football, the Jaffas won the Grand Final 2–0, beating Weston Workers Bears (who have had 50 consecutive years in the top division).

In 2016, the club qualified for the FFA Cup regular rounds for the first time, but exited the competition at the Round of 32, losing 1–0 to NPL Tasmania side Devonport City FC at Valley Road Ground in Devonport, Tasmania.

Current squad

Honours
 National Premier Leagues Northern NSW premiers: 2021
 National Premier Leagues Northern NSW runners-up: 2013, 2019
 NPL Northern NSW Grand Final winners: 2014, 2022
 NPL Northern NSW Grand Final runners-up: 2013

References

External links
 Lambton Jaffas Official Site

National Premier Leagues clubs
Soccer clubs in Newcastle, New South Wales
Association football clubs established in 1957
1957 establishments in Australia
Sports teams in Newcastle, New South Wales